Kickboxing was contested at the 2009 Asian Indoor Games in Ho Chi Minh City, Vietnam from 3 to 7 November.  The competition took place at Vân Đồn Gymnasium.

Medalists

Point fighting

Low kick

Medal table

Results

Point fighting

Men's 63 kg

Men's 74 kg

Women's 50 kg

Low kick

Men's 51 kg

Men's 54 kg

Men's 67 kg

Men's 75 kg

Women's 52 kg

References
 Official site

2009
2009 Asian Indoor Games events
Asian Indoor and Martial Arts Games